Carabus chamissonis is a species of ground beetle in the family Carabidae. It is found in tundra regions across northern Canada and Alaska, as well as isolated populations on Mount Washington, New Hampshire and Katahdin in Maine.  This is a species of open, dry tundra environments - generally better drained than those occupied in the Arctic by Carabus truncaticollis

References

Further reading

 

chamissonis
Articles created by Qbugbot
Beetles described in 1820